Souhegan may refer to:

 The Souhegan River in the U.S. state of New Hampshire
 Souhegan High School, along the Souhegan River in Amherst, New Hampshire

See also 
 Skowhegan, Maine